It Was Twenty Years Ago Today may refer to:

 "It was twenty years ago today", the first line of the 1967 Beatles song "Sgt. Pepper's Lonely Hearts Club Band"
 It Was Twenty Years Ago Today (film), a 1987 British television documentary film
 "It Was Twenty Years Ago Today" (Roseanne), a 1993 television episode